Wang Yafan was the defending champion and successfully defended her title, defeating Han Na-lae in the final, 6–4, 6–2.

Seeds

Draw

Finals

Top half

Bottom half

References
Main Draw

Liuzhou International Challenger - Singles